Frederick or Fred Baker may refer to:

Frederick Baker (1965–2020), Austrian-British filmmaker and film producer
Frederick Baker, convicted of, and executed for, the murder of Fanny Adams (died 1867)
Fred Baker (physician) (1854–1938), American physician, malacologist, founder of the Scripps Institution of Oceanography
Fred Baker (soldier) (1908–1958), New Zealand army officer
Fred Baker (engineer) (born 1952), American engineer
Frederick Baker (cricketer) (1851–1939), Australian cricketer
Frederick Francis Baker (1772–1830), fellow of the Royal Society
Frederick R. Baker, American farmer, soldier, and politician
Fred Thelonious Baker (born 1960), English musician
Fred L. Baker (1872–1927), industrialist, shipbuilder and member of the Los Angeles City Council
Frederick Baker (1850–1888), English opera singer whose stage name was Frederick Federici

See also 
H. F. Baker (1866–1956), British mathematician
Frederick Arnold-Baker, British lawyer